Washburn is a census-designated place (CDP) comprising the main village within the town of Washburn in Aroostook County, Maine, United States. The population of the CDP was 997 at the 2010 census, out of a population of 1,687 for the entire town.

Geography
The Washburn CDP is located in the western part of the town of Washburn, at the junction of Maine State Routes 164 and 228.

Demographics

References

Census-designated places in Maine
Census-designated places in Aroostook County, Maine